Edward York may refer to:
 Edward York (politician) (1730–ca 1790), sea captain and politician in Nova Scotia
 Edward York (architect) (1863–1928), American architect

Edward of York may refer to
Edward of Norwich, 2nd Duke of York (c.1373–1415)
Edward IV of England (1442–1483), also known as Edward of York
Edward V of England (1470–c.1483), son of the above
Edward of Middleham, Prince of Wales (1473–1484), cousin of the above
Prince Edward, Duke of York and Albany (1739–1767)
Edward VIII (1894–1972), who was known as Prince Edward of York from 1894 to 1901